Elizabeth Wanjiru Wathuti (born August 1, 1995) is a Kenyan environment and climate activist and founder of the Green Generation Initiative, which nurtures young people to love nature and be environmentally conscious at a young age and has now planted 30,000 tree seedlings in Kenya.

In 2019, she was awarded the Africa Green Person of the Year Award by the Eleven Eleven Twelve Foundation and named as one of the 100 Most Influential Young Africans by the Africa Youth Awards.

Education 
Wathuti graduated from Kenyatta University with a Bachelor's Degree in Environmental Studies and Community Development.

Early childhood and environmental activism 

Wathuti grew up in Nyeri County, which is renowned for having the highest forest cover in Kenya. She planted her first tree at the age of seven and she established an environmental club in her high school with the help of her geography teacher. She was part of the leadership of Kenyatta University Environmental Club (KUNEC) where she was able to conduct numerous activities; such as tree planting, clean ups and environmental education; all while increasing awareness of global environmental challenges like climate change.

In 2016, she founded Green Generation Initiative, to encourage young environmental enthusiasts, environmental and climate education, building climate resilience and greening schools. Her video "The Forest is a Part of Me" was featured by the Global Landscapes Forum (GLF) as part of a series on Youth Voices in Landscapes.

She is a recipient of a Wangari Maathai Scholarship award for her commitment to environmental conservation. Wathuti is also a member of the Green Belt Movement, which was founded by her role model Professor Wangari Maathai

Awards
In 2019 on International Youth Day, she was recognized by the Duke and Duchess of Sussex on their Instagram feed for her work in environmental conservation. She featured on the Queen's Commonwealth Trust website. In the same year she was named alongside Vanessa Nakate and Oladuso Adenike by Greenpeace as one of three young black climate activists in Africa trying to save the world.

Awards and recognitions 

 2016 fourth Wangari Maathai Scholarship Award
 Green Climate Fund Climate Youth Champion Award 2019
 Africa Green Person of the Year 2019 Award by the Eleven Eleven Twelve Foundation.
 100 Most Influential Young African by the Africa Youth Awards.
 The Diana International Award (2019)
 UN Young Champions of the Earth Regional finalist for Africa (2019)
 International Youth Day 2019 Recognition by the Duke and Duchess of Sussex.
 Bloggers Association of Kenya - BAKE Awards (2018)   for the best environmental blog.

References

External links 
 * 
 
 

1995 births
Living people
21st-century Kenyan women
Climate activists
Kenyan women environmentalists
Youth climate activists
Kenyatta University alumni
People from Nyeri County